St. Mary's Academy is a private Catholic K-12 school in New Orleans, Louisiana run by the Sisters of the Holy Family. Founded in 1867, it is one of the oldest Black Catholic schools in the country.

It admits girls and boys until grade 7, and admits only girls for grades 8-12. The academy has a long tradition as a private Catholic college preparatory co-educational elementary and a middle/high school for young women.

History 
The school was founded in 1867 by the Sisters of the Holy Family, the second Black Catholic religious order in the United States, as a place where Black children could be educated during segregation. The founder, Venerable Henriette DeLille, was a Creole of color who has since become venerated within the Church.

The school has undergone two moves in its history, having started closer to the heart of the city (in the French Quarter). It moved within the neighborhood shortly thereafter, and finally came to its present location in New Orleans East in 1965.

The school built a brand-new facility following Hurricane Katrina, which heavily damaged the previous structure. The new building, which began serving male students in the lower school, was completed in 2011.

In September 2022, the school announced the hiring of its first-ever lay president, Pamela M. Rogers.

Athletics
St. Mary's Academy athletics competes in the LHSAA.

Notable alumni
 Leah Chase, Louisiana Creole chef
 Tiffany Doss, College Softball Player, Class of 2014, First Player from SMA to ever receive a college softball scholarship.

References

External links
 St. Mary's Academy website

Catholic secondary schools in New Orleans
Catholic elementary schools in Louisiana
Private K-12 schools in New Orleans
Girls' schools in Louisiana
Educational institutions established in 1867
1867 establishments in Louisiana
Catholic schools in Louisiana
African-American Roman Catholic schools
Sisters of the Holy Family (Louisiana)